Francisco Javier Iriarte Garro (born November 11, 1986, in Zizur Mayor) is a Spanish former professional road bicycle racer.

In October 2012, Iriarte announced his retirement because of recurring left leg muscle pain.

Major results
2009
 5th Overall Vuelta a Salamanca
1st Stage 4
2010
 1st Road race, Navarre Regional Road Championships

References

External links

1986 births
Living people
Spanish male cyclists
Cyclists from Navarre
People from Cuenca de Pamplona